Samuel Howard Blackmer (March 2, 1902 – December 25, 1951) was a Vermont attorney, politician, and judge.  He was appointed as an associate justice of the Vermont Supreme Court in 1949, and served until his death.

Early life
Blackmer was born in Bennington, Vermont on March 2, 1902, the son of Samuel Huling Blackmer and Fanny (Abbott) Blackmer.  He attended the schools of Bennington, and in 1920 he graduated from the Hotchkiss School in Lakeville, Connecticut.  He graduated from Yale University with a Bachelor of Arts degree in 1924, and was a member of Zeta Psi and Delta Sigma Rho.  In 1927, Blackmer received his LL.B. degree from Harvard Law School, where he was a member of the Lincoln's Inn Society.  He was admitted to the bar in 1927, and practiced in Bennington as the partner of Judge William J. Meagher, who had married Fanny Blackmer after the 1911 death of Samuel Huling Blackmer.

Early career
A Republican, Blackmer served as an Old Bennington village trustee from 1927 to 1938.  He served as a justice of the peace from 1929 to 1938, and was Bennington's municipal court judge from 1929 to 1932.  from 1933 to 1935 he represented Bennington in the Vermont House of Representatives.  He served as State's Attorney of Bennington County from 1935 to 1937.

During the governorship of George Aiken, Blackmer served as his executive clerk from 1937 to 1938.

Judicial career
In 1938, Aiken appointed Blackmer a judge of the Vermont Superior Court.  He rose through seniority to become the court's chief judge, and served until 1949.  In April 1949, Blackmer was named as an associate justice of the Vermont Supreme Court, filling the vacancy created when John C. Sherburne was promoted to chief justice.  Blackmer served on the Supreme Court until his death, and was succeeded by Stephen S. Cushing.

Death and burial
Blackmer died unexpectedly of a heart attack in Bennington on December 25, 1951.  He was buried at Old Bennington Cemetery.

Family
On July 20, 1925, Blackmer married Katrina Roosevelt Schuyler, the daughter of Marie Louise (Nelson) Schuyler (b. 1865) and the Reverend Philip Schuyler (1861-1942), a member of New York's prominent Schuyler family.  They were the parents of a daughter, Patricia Ann (1927-1998).

Legacy
The Samuel H. Blackmer Memorial Library was incorporated in August 1952.  It was established in the Bennington County Courthouse, and included the books from Blackmer's personal law library, as well as an endowment from his family.

References

Sources

Books

Newspapers

Internet

Magazines

External links

Samuel Howard Blackmer at The Political Graveyard

1902 births
1951 deaths
People from Bennington, Vermont
Hotchkiss School alumni
Yale University alumni
Harvard Law School alumni
Vermont lawyers
Republican Party members of the Vermont House of Representatives
State's attorneys in Vermont
Justices of the Vermont Supreme Court
Burials in Vermont
20th-century American politicians
20th-century American judges
20th-century American lawyers